Olushola Olumuyiwa Aganun (born 4 May 1984) is a Nigerian footballer who plays as a forward for Austrian 1. Klasse club Sans Papiers-Die Bunten.

Career 
In 2001, Aganun was scouted to Reggiana together with Obafemi and Oladipupo Martins. However, unlike the Martins brothers Aganun returned to Nigeria. He later moved to Malta and Msida Saint-Joseph, then Austria and Wacker Innsbruck. He joined SC-ESV Parndorf in 2009. He played a trial game with Darlington in August 2009 against Bradford Park Avenue. In September 2009 he returned to Malta where he signed again for Msida Saint-Joseph. In 2011, he plays for Hòa Phát Hà Nội of the V.League 1.

In April 2012 he played for Hoang Anh Gia Lai of the V.League 1.

In 2016, he returned to lower tier football in Austria, joining SC Neusiedl/Zaya. Ahead of the 2022–23 season, Aganun played for seventh tier 1. Klasse club Sans Papiers-Die Bunten from Vienna.

References

External links
 

1984 births
Living people
Nigerian footballers
Nigerian expatriate footballers
Yoruba sportspeople
Sportspeople from Lagos
Maltese Premier League players
Austrian Football Bundesliga players
Austrian Regionalliga players
V.League 1 players
A.C. Reggiana 1919 players
Msida Saint-Joseph F.C. players
FC Wacker Innsbruck (2002) players
SC-ESV Parndorf 1919 players
Dong Thap FC players
Hòa Phát Hà Nội FC players
Hoang Anh Gia Lai FC players
Expatriate footballers in Malta
Expatriate footballers in Austria
Expatriate footballers in Vietnam
Nigerian expatriate sportspeople in Malta
Nigerian expatriate sportspeople in Austria
Nigerian expatriate sportspeople in Vietnam
Association football forwards